Jugantar Patrika was a Bengali revolutionary newspaper founded in 1906 in Calcutta by Barindra Kumar Ghosh, Abhinash Bhattacharya and Bhupendranath Dutt. A political weekly, it was founded in March 1906 and served as the propaganda organ for the nascent revolutionary organisation Anushilan Samiti that was taking shape in Bengal at the time. The journal derived its name 'Jugantar' (: New Era) from a political novel of the same name by Bengali author Shivnath Shastri. The journal went on to lend its name to the Western Bengal wing of the Anushilan Samiti, which came to be known as the Jugantar group. The journal expounded and justified revolutionary violence against the British Raj as a political tool for independence, and denounced the right and legitimacy of the British rule in India. It was also critical of the Indian National Congress and its moderate methods which was viewed as aiding the Raj.  Its target audience was the young, literate and politically motivated youth of Bengal, and was priced at one paisa. 

The paper rapidly acquired a broad popularity, at one time having a readership of 20,000. Bhupendranath Dutt served as the editor of the newspaper till his arrest in 1907, although it also published articles from a number of noted Bengali revolutionaries including Barindra Kumar Ghosh and Aurobindo Ghosh. It faced prosecution a number of times by the British Indian government for publishing seditious articles. Bhupendranath Dutt was arrested in 1907 for publication of articles "inciting violence against the Government of India", for which he was sentenced to a year's rigorous imprisonment. The paper was ultimately forced to shut down in down in 1908, amidst financial ruins following the prosecutions, and after the passage of The Newspapers (Incitement to offences) Act in June 1908 which made its position vulnerable.

References

 Legitimising Violence: Seditious Propaganda and Revolutionary Pamphlets in Bengal, 1908–1918, Sanyal S., The Journal of Asian Studies, vol. 67, n° 3, 2008, pp. 759–787.

Anushilan Samiti
Revolutionary movement for Indian independence
Newspapers published in Kolkata
Bengali-language newspapers published in India
Literature of Indian independence movement
Defunct newspapers published in India
Publications established in 1906
1906 establishments in India